The men's javelin throw event at the 2015 Asian Athletics Championships was held on June 6.

Results

References

Javelin
Javelin throw at the Asian Athletics Championships